Natalia Vitalyevna Shaposhnikova (born 24 June 1961, in Rostov-on-Don), married name Natalia Sout, is a former Soviet artistic gymnast, two-time Olympic champion, and Honoured Master of Sports of the USSR. She was known for her risky, original skills and expressive choreography, especially on balance beam and floor exercise.

Competitive career

Shaposhnikova trained at Dynamo in Rostov-on-Don under Honoured Trainer of the USSR Vladislav Rastorotsky, who also trained her compatriots Ludmilla Tourischeva and Natalia Yurchenko. She was one of the world's strongest gymnasts in the late 1970s and early 1980s, especially on vault. She was known for her difficulty and originality, especially her one-armed handstands on beam. At the 1979 European Championships, she performed one of the first triple twists on floor, and her opening tumbling pass on floor at the 1980 Olympic Games was a roundoff 1.5-twisting layout immediately into a roundoff back handspring double pike.

At the 1980 Olympics in Moscow, she contributed to the Soviet team's gold medal and won an individual gold medal on vault. She also took home bronze medals on floor and beam, and missed a medal in the all-around by just 0.05.

Shaposhnikova came close to winning gold on beam at the 1978 World Championships, entering the final with a slight lead over Nadia Comăneci of Romania. However, Peter Shilston wrote in an April 1980 profile in British Gymnast magazine: "There was a fiercely partisan section of the audience determined that Comăneci should win to make up for her previous disappointing performances. When Natasha (Natalia?) came up, needing a score of 9.8 to take the gold, she faced a very hostile reception which clearly got on her nerves. She made a series of mistakes, all jeeringly received, and slumped from first place to eighth." Shilston called the loss "probably the saddest experience of Natasha's (Natalia's?) life".

Eponymous skill
Shaposhnikova invented a complex transition skill on the uneven bars—a clear hip circle on the low bar with flight backward to the high bar—and it is named after her in the Code of Points. The skill, sometimes referred to colloquially as the "Shaposh", is still widely performed today; it is credited as a D element in the 2013–16 Code of Points.

Since the 1990s, other gymnasts have developed variations of the Shaposhnikova, including Americans Amy Chow (who performed the skill with a stalder entry instead of a clear hip) and Kristen Maloney (toe-on entry); Russians Viktoria Komova (inbar stalder entry) and Svetlana Khorkina (Shaposhnikova with a half turn during the transition between the bars); Laura van Leeuwen of the Netherlands (toe-on entry plus a half turn);Aliya Mustafina and Yao Jinnan (Chow half) and Elisabeth Seitz of Germany (toe-on entry with a full turn during the transition).

Coaching career
Shaposhnikova and her husband, Pavel Sout, a gold medalist in men's gymnastics at the 1981 World Championships, currently coach at Gymnastika in Woodland Park, New Jersey.

Achievements (non-Olympic)

References

External links
 
 Natalia Shaposhnikova at Gymn Forum
 
 
 
 
 

1961 births
Living people
Sportspeople from Rostov-on-Don
Russian female artistic gymnasts
Soviet female artistic gymnasts
Olympic gold medalists for the Soviet Union
Olympic bronze medalists for the Soviet Union
Olympic gymnasts of the Soviet Union
Olympic medalists in gymnastics
Gymnasts at the 1980 Summer Olympics
Medalists at the World Artistic Gymnastics Championships
Dynamo sports society athletes
Originators of elements in artistic gymnastics
People from Woodland Park, New Jersey
Medalists at the 1980 Summer Olympics
European champions in gymnastics